The Central Bank of Tunisia (BCT) is the central bank of Tunisia.  The bank is in Tunis and its current governor is Marouane Abassi, who replaced Chedly Ayari on 16 February 2018.

History
Tunisia gained independence in 1956.  The Central Bank of Tunisia was formed two years later in 1958.  In December 1958 the newly created Tunisian dinar was disconnected from the French franc. The bank maintains a Money Museum which includes a collection of recovered Carthaginian coins.

Tunisia had a historically low inflation. The Tunisian Dinar was less volatile in 2000–2010 than the currencies of its oil-importing neighbors, Egypt and Morocco. Inflation was 4.9% in fiscal year 2007–08 and 3.5% in fiscal year 2008–09.

Operations

The BCT has 12 branch banks.

Governors
Since its foundation, the following governors have succeeded at the head of the institution:

 30 septembre 1958 – 9 novembre 1970: Hédi Nouira
 10 novembre 1970 – 18 février 1972: Ali Zouaoui
 4 mars 1972 – 7 mai 1980: Mohamed Ghenima
 8 mai 1980 – 11 juillet 1980: Abdelaziz Mathari
 12 juillet 1980 – 14 mars 1986: Moncef Belkhodja
 15 mars 1986 – 26 octobre 1987: Mohamed Skhiri
 27 octobre 1987 – 2 mars 1990: Ismaïl Khelil
 3 mars 1990 – 22 janvier 2001: Mohamed El Béji Hamda
 23 janvier 2001 – 13 janvier 2004: Mohamed Daouas
 14 janvier 2004 – 16 janvier 2011: Taoufik Baccar
 17 janvier 2011 – 27 juin 2012: Mustapha Kamel Nabli
 23 juillet 2012 – 14 février 2018: Chedly Ayari
 16 février 2018: Marouane Abassi

See also

 Tunisian dinar
 Banking in Tunisia
 Economy of Tunisia
 List of central banks of Africa
 List of central banks

References

External links
 Official site: Banque Centrale de Tunisie

Tunisia
Banks of Tunisia
Economy of Tunisia
Tunis
Banks established in 1958
1958 establishments in Tunisia